The M11 is a  motorway that runs north from the North Circular Road (A406) in South Woodford to the A14, northwest of Cambridge, England. Originally proposed as a trunk road as early as 1915, various plans were considered throughout the 1960s, with final construction being undertaken between 1975 and 1980. The motorway was opened in stages, with the first stage between junctions 7 and 8 opening in June 1975, and the completed motorway becoming fully operational in February 1980. Running from Woodford to Girton, the motorway provides direct access to Harlow, Cambridge and since 2002, greatly improved access to London Stansted Airport.

Route
The M11 starts in South Woodford in northeast London, just north of Redbridge Roundabout, crosses the North Circular (A406) at junction 4, it then heads NNE, passing east of Loughton and Theydon Bois as well as Epping Forest, meeting the M25 motorway at junction 6, and then veering approximately north, passing to the east of Harlow. The M11 gives access to Bishop's Stortford and the motorway's only service station via junction 8. This is followed immediately by the recently constructed junction 8A, which provides a free-flow link to the improved A120 that links to Stansted Airport. The M11 then traverses part of Cambridgeshire, meeting a spur for the A11 at junction 9, Stump Cross, and then finally ends at junction 14, the Girton Interchange, with the road continuing through the junction and becoming the A14, which continues the route on to Huntingdon and the north.

The motorway starts with two lanes southbound and three northbound; then, north of Woodford Bridge, both directions have three lanes, a layout that continues up to junction 8A, except for a brief two-lane section at junction 6, beneath the M25. From junction 8 the motorway has two lanes in both directions all the way to junction 14 where the motorway terminates. The motorway is illuminated at the southern terminus near junction 4, at junction 6 (the M25 interchange), and also at the approach to junction 8/8A (Stansted Airport/Bishop's Stortford), and then at the northern terminus at junction 14, for the A14. All four of these sections use modern high-pressure sodium (SON) lighting. The older, yellow, low-pressure sodium (SOX) lighting originally used at junctions 4 and 6 was replaced in 2005. The M11 junctions 1, 2 and 3 do not exist; see the History section below for explanation.

History

Planning
Plans for an 'Eastern Avenue' in London had been proposed as early as 1915, and the Eastern Avenue Extension was causing local concern in Leyton and Hackney during the late 1950s and early 1960s. It was opposed by a number of groups, including the Hackney Society and local residents as represented by their member of parliament in 1962.

By 1966, the Ministry of Transport was planning a longer road and for it to be partly motorway. The first version had a mid-south section, to follow a River Lea route, starting at Angel southwest of Dalston, heading northeast then north, taking land by the river in Walthamstow, Chingford and Waltham Cross, and meeting the built road alignment of today north of Harlow. The road from South Woodford to Islington would have been designated as the M12. The route was in planning stages with several options, with differences between the plans preferred by the Greater London Council and the Ministry of Transport – a different version called for this 'Eastern Avenue' to run more east–west alongside the Regent's Canal and the north side of Victoria Park, Hackney Wick, where it would have connected to the North Cross and East Cross Routes at the northeast corner of an inner ringway identified by the London Ringways plan.

There were three proposed routes from the inner to outer ringway (North Circular) at the base of the current M11 and it is unclear which one was favoured.

Under one scheme, south of South Woodford a connection would have been made with the western end of a proposed "M12" towards Colchester. These proposals also made the case for an M15 motorway for the Ringway 2, a major upgrade of the North Circular Road to typical motorway standard. When the southern end of the current M11 ended here, space was provided between the two carriageways to enable an offshoot of 'the M12' to merge from the southwest: junctions 1, 2 and 3 were reserved for this additional inner London section. Part of the unbuilt route of a southern section of the M11 is seen from a sliproad from the North Circular to the M11 which travels over a bridge over bare land.

It was announced in March 1975 that from junction 8 (Bishops Stortford/Stansted exit) to the northern terminus, (thus including the Cambridge western bypass) would not be "constructed to M1 standard". This was another way of stating that, following a change in government policy, this section would comprise two rather than three lanes in each direction.

Additions
The M11 Link Road, or more formally 'A12 Hackney to M11 link road' (in fact leading to the North Circular) was constructed during the 1990s from Hackney Wick by Victoria Park to the Redbridge Roundabout—the interchange with the North Circular—and was opened in 1999. The route of this road, which followed a similar route to one of the initial proposals resulted in the protracted M11 link road protest between 1993 and 1995, one of a spate of major UK road protests under the Major ministry.

A new junction 7a was opened on 10 June 2022. The stated aims for this development are:
 Create a new east–west link, which will move traffic smoothly out of Harlow on to the M11
 Reduce congestion on the north–south links through Harlow and towards junction 7
 Create new public transport and sustainable travel opportunities 
 Provide new opportunities for housing and business developments.

Abortive/suspended proposals

Junction 5
An official plan to add north-facing connections at junction 5 in Debden, Loughton was abandoned in 1998.

Junctions 6 to 8

The Highways Agency tabled proposals to upgrade the M11, between junction 6 and 8, from three lanes plus hard shoulder to four each way with an estimated cost of £698 million given in 2007.
A number of public consultations were made throughout 2007 and although efforts were made to limit environmental damage the scheme would cause disruption and loss of habitat to three designated ecological areas and a Site of Special Scientific Interest (SSSI) at Gernon Bushes.Maps of the proposal and previously discounted options were published by the Highways Agency. Plans were abandoned in March 2009 when the Secretary of State for Transport announced that no changes would be made to this section of motorway before 2021.

Construction
The motorway was opened in stages. The stretch between junctions 7 and 8 opened in 1975, and that between junctions 4 and 7 in 1977. The stretch from junctions 8 to 9 opened in 1979; that between junctions 9 and 14 in 1980; and the full length becoming fully operational in February 1980.

South of this stretch, where the road runs on soft ground close to the River Roding, concrete was considered unsuitable owing to the looseness of the subsoil and the consequent risk of random cracking, so the surface here was of tarmac from the start.

Services
The motorway's first, and only, service station, Birchanger Green Services at junction 8, opened in 1996. The services also serve the A120, a major high-speed dual-carriageway road, running from junction 8A to the eastern fringe of Braintree, it continues on to Colchester as a busy single-carriageway road.

There had been plans for a service station on the motorway as long ago as 1969, named Chigwell, between that village and Loughton, which led to the construction of spur roads and a restricted lorry park; during the London Olympics 2012 these were used as a works unit. The plans for a service station at this site were officially dropped in 1980.

Operation
From the late 1990s onward, the concrete surface that had greatly degraded was progressively replaced with standard layers of tarmac, and drainage improvements were implemented at the same time. This work was completed in June 2008.

Junction 8A for the A120 road and Stansted Airport opened in December 2002.

Proposed developments
By way of complementary plans for proposed expansion of Stansted Airport, the Highways Agency collaborated with BAA on improvements to transport access to the airport including two proposals for the M11, one of which has been deemed unnecessary, junctions 6–8, see above and the other of which, including spur road and junction additions may be approved by the government if Stansted expansion takes place.

M11 and A120 interchange – Stansted generation 2 airport access

A joint scheme involving works on junctions on the M11 and A120. This scheme was part of an aborted plan to add a second runway to Stansted Airport. It proposed changes to junction 8 of the M11 with the creation of junction 8B, linked to and situated just north of junction 8/8A and the creation of a new junction on the A120, to provide additional rapid access to the expanded airport. The scheme was given an estimated cost of £131million in May 2008. Throughout 2007, a number of public consultations and exhibitions were held. Findings from these showed that although the public had several concerns regarding environmental impact 57% of attendees agreed the scheme would be necessary if the Stansted Airport expansion proceeded. Following the public consultation, the preferred route was published on 5 March 2008 and the draft orders on 27 March 2008. A pre-public inquiry meeting took place on 10 November 2008, with a public inquiry due in April 2009. However, this was delayed until further notice following BAA's appeal against the March 2009 ruling of the Competition Commission and the proposal lapsed when the application for a second runway was withdrawn by BAA in 2010.

Incidents

Plane crash
On 2 June 2002, a brake failure on an Aero L-39 Albatross landing at the Imperial War Museum Duxford caused the plane to run off the end of the runway and down an embankment onto the southbound carriageway of the motorway. The trainee pilot was killed when he ejected at ground level, but the instructor survived the accident and no vehicles on the motorway were involved.

Snow storm
In January 2003, thousands of motorists became stranded on "White Friday" for up to 20hours between junctions 7 and 9 during a snowstorm.

Junctions

Data from driver location signs are used to provide distance and carriageway identifier information.

In popular culture
Life in the Fast Lane: The No M11 Story (1995) is a documentary film that recounts the story of the No M11 Campaign.

See also
List of motorways in the United Kingdom

Notes and references
Notes 

References

External links

 CBRD Motorway Database – M11
 The Motorway Archive – M11

Motorways in England
Roads in Cambridgeshire
Transport in Uttlesford
Transport in the London Borough of Redbridge
Transport in Epping Forest District
Motorways in London